Segedin or Šegedin may refer to:

 Sanjak of Segedin, an administrative territorial entity of the Ottoman Empire whose capital was Szeged
 Szeged, a city in Hungary whose name in the Serbian language is Segedin
 Leo Segedin (born 1927), American artist and educator
 Petar Šegedin (disambiguation)
 Rob Segedin (born 1988), American MLB player

See also
 Séguédin (disambiguation)